Andrew Johnston may refer to:
Andrew Johnston (critic) (1968–2008), film and TV critic
Andrew Johnston (English politician) (1835–1895), Liberal Party Member of Parliament for Southern Essex 1868–1874
Andrew Johnston (golfer) (born 1989), English golfer
Andrew Johnston (poet) (born 1963), New Zealand poet
Andrew Johnston (Scottish politician) ( – 1862), Whig Member of Parliament for Anstruther Burghs 1831–1832 and St Andrews Burghs 1832–1837
Andrew Johnston (singer) (born 1994), British boy soprano
Andrew Johnston (New Jersey politician) (1694–1762), politician from New Jersey
Andrew Johnston (footballer) (born 1970), Australian rules footballer 
Andrew Johnston (surgeon) (1770–1833), president of the Royal College of Surgeons in Ireland
Andrew Johnston, aka Andrew Griswold, Northern Irish musician with The Dangerfields

See also
Andrew Johnson (disambiguation)